Ernest Chavez may refer to:
 Ernest Chavez (politician)
 Ernest Chavez (fighter)